Matthew McGinley (born 15 August 1989) is a Scottish professional footballer, who plays as a goalkeeper for Rutherglen Glencairn.

He started his senior career with Scottish First Division side Greenock Morton, after playing junior football.

Career
McGinley moved to Greenock Morton on 14 September 2011 from Lanarkshire junior side Rutherglen Glencairn, where he had only been signed since July 2011 from Vale of Clyde.

He made his début for Morton at Almondvale Stadium, against Livingston. McGinley fouled Marc McNulty to concede a penalty, which was converted by Iain Russell, in a 1-1 draw.

McGinley was released by Morton in May 2012.

He signed for Albion Rovers after his release from Morton. After leaving Rovers, McGinley signed for newly formed Lowland Football League side BSC Glasgow. After leaving BSC Glasgow, McGinley signed for Lowland Football League side East Kilbride. He most notably played in the 2-0 defeat to Scottish Premiership side and leaders Celtic in their Scottish Cup 5th round tie in 2016.

McGinley left East Kilbride in May 2021 and re-joined Rutherglen Glencairn on 2 June 2021.

Honours
BSC Glasgow
 SFA South Region Challenge Cup: 2014-15

East Kilbride
 Lowland Football League: 2016-17; 2018-19

 SFA South Region Challenge Cup: 2016–17, 2018-19

Lowland League Cup: 2015-16

East of Scotland Qualifying Cup: 2015-16; 2017-18

East of Scotland City Cup: 2015-16

See also
Greenock Morton F.C. season 2011-12

References

External links

1988 births
Living people
Association football goalkeepers
Scottish Junior Football Association players
Scottish Football League players
West of Scotland Football League players
Scottish footballers
Greenock Morton F.C. players
Footballers from Glasgow
Albion Rovers F.C. players
Rutherglen Glencairn F.C. players
Scottish Professional Football League players
Broomhill F.C. (Scotland) players
Lowland Football League players
East Kilbride F.C. players